Dmitry Viktorovich Bachek (born 13 December 2000) is a Kazakhstani footballer who plays as a midfielder for Antequera.

Career
As a youth player, Bachek joined the youth academy of Brazilian side Olé Brasil.

Bachek started his career with Kazakhstani top flight club Shakhter, where he made seven appearances, attracted the interest of VfB Stuttgart in the German second division, and almost joined the youth academy of Italian Serie A team Roma but the transfer never happened.

In 2019, Bachek signed for Bolat in the Kazakhstani second division.

In 2020, he signed for Spanish third division outfit Poblense after receiving interest from Croatia.

References

External links
 
 

2000 births
Living people
Sportspeople from Karaganda
Kazakhstani footballers
Association football midfielders
Kazakhstan Premier League players
Kazakhstan First Division players
Segunda División B players
Segunda Federación players
FC Shakhter Karagandy players
FC Bolat players
UD Poblense players
Kazakhstani expatriate footballers
Kazakhstani expatriate sportspeople in Brazil
Expatriate footballers in Brazil
Kazakhstani expatriate sportspeople in Spain
Expatriate footballers in Spain